As Time Goes By (originally titled The Cricketer) is a 1988 Australian science fiction comedy film directed by Barry Peak and starring Max Gillies, Bruno Lawrence, and Nique Needles. The title song is heard in the Australian version of the film but not in overseas prints, because of its high cost.

Plot synopsis
He encounters a series of unusual small town characters and the small-town cop "Rider", before being dragged into a world of small-town politics, time travel and a scheme involving Joe Bogart, a time-travelling alien whose spaceship's camouflage unit stopped working while he was in Los Alamos working on the Manhattan project; " Joe Bogart's"

Cast
 Bruno Lawrence as Ryder
 Nique Needles as Mike
 Ray Barrett as J.L. Weston
 Marcelle Schmitz as Connie Stanton
 Mitchell Faircloth as James McCauley
 Max Gillies as Joe Bogart
 Deborah Force as Cheryl
 Christine Keogh as Margie
 Don Bridges as Ern
 Jane Clifton as Mechanic

Accolades
Nique Needles won Best Actor in A Science Fiction Film at the 1988 Fantafestival.

References

External links
 As Time Goes By at IMDb
 As Time Goes By at Oz Movies

Australian science fiction comedy films
Films about time travel
1980s English-language films
1988 films
1988 science fiction films
1980s Australian films